Latiromitra cacozeliana is a species of sea snail, a marine gastropod mollusk in the family Costellariidae.

Description
The length of the shell attains 33.3 mm.

Distribution
This marine species occurs off Vanuatu.

References

External links
 P. & Kantor Y. (2000). The anatomy and systematics of Latiromitra, a genus of tropical deep-water Ptychatractinae (Gastropoda: Turbinellidae). The Veliger 43(1): 1-23

Costellariidae
Gastropods described in 2000